Roseateles depolymerans is an aerobic photosynthetic bacterium from the genus Roseateles, which was isolated from river water (Hanamuro River, Tsukuba, Japan).

R. depolymerans is a bacteriochlorophyll a-containing obligate aerobe in the β-subclass of the Proteobacteria. The cells are motile, straight rods, and they contain poly-β-hydroxybutyrate granules.

R. depolymerans is characterised by the ability to biodegrade the material poly(hexamethylene carbonate) (PHC), and some other biodegradable plastics.

References

External links
Type strain of Roseateles depolymerans at BacDive -  the Bacterial Diversity Metadatabase

Comamonadaceae
Bacteria described in 1999